Cofie Bekoe (born 16 March 1988) is a Ghanaian footballer who plays for Libyan side Ittihad as an attacking midfielder.

Career
Cofie began his career by Nania F.C. and plays with his team by the Youth Cup in Altstetten 2004 and 2005, he was with his team in the Final 2004 and 2005 won also the silver medal. The team captain from Nania F.C. moved in July 2005 to Lebanese club Tripoli SC, before in January 2006 joined to Tema Youth. He played the 2007/08 season on an eight months loan with Kuala Lumpur FA in Malaysia where he scored 5 goals in the league and 2 in cup matches, he then returned to finish the season with Tema Youth. Bekoe was set to join Accra Hearts of Oak SC, but instead Petrojet made a very quick move and the player welcomed it likewise his manager on 17 December 2008.

Position
Bekoe is a midfield allrounder. He plays as an attacking midfielder all across the pitch and sometimes as a right-sided forward or striker.

References

Ghanaian footballers
Expatriate footballers in Lebanon
Expatriate footballers in Malaysia
Tema Youth players
Expatriate footballers in Egypt
Ghanaian expatriate sportspeople in Egypt
F.C. Nania players
Ghanaian expatriate sportspeople in Malaysia
Petrojet SC players
Lierse S.K. players
Belgian Pro League players
Expatriate footballers in Belgium
Ghanaian expatriate sportspeople in Belgium
Al-Ittihad Club (Tripoli) players
Expatriate footballers in Libya
Ghanaian expatriate sportspeople in Libya
1988 births
Living people
Association football midfielders
Ghanaian expatriate footballers
Ghanaian expatriate sportspeople in Lebanon
Lebanese Premier League players
AC Tripoli players
Ghana international footballers
Libyan Premier League players